Stracilla is a genus of moths in the subfamily Lymantriinae. The genus was erected by Per Olof Christopher Aurivillius in 1910.

Species 
 Stracilla fowleri Collenette 1956
 Stracilla ghesquierei Collenette 1937
 Stracilla translucida Oberthür 1880

References

Lymantriinae